DST Group may refer to:
DataStream Technology Group, Brunei (e.g. DST Group Building)
Defence Science and Technology Group, Australia's Defence research agency